The 2010 Tail Savannah Challenger was a professional tennis tournament played on outdoor green clay courts. It was part of the 2010 ATP Challenger Tour. It took place in Savannah, United States between May 3 and May 9, 2010.

Entrants

Seeds

 Rankings are as of April 26, 2010.

Other entrants
The following players received wildcards into the singles main draw:
  Jan-Michael Gambill
  Daniel Kosakowski
  Greg Ouellette
  Fritz Wolmarans

The following players received entry from the qualifying draw:
  Roman Borvanov
  Luka Gregorc
  Cecil Mamiit
  Nicholas Monroe

The following player received entry with protected ranking:
  Kei Nishikori

The following player received the lucky loser spot:
  Kaden Hensel

Champions

Singles

 Kei Nishikori def.  Ryan Sweeting, 6–4, 6–0

Doubles

 Jamie Baker /  James Ward def.  Bobby Reynolds /  Fritz Wolmarans, 6–3, 6–4

External links
Official website
ITF search 

Tail Savannah Challenger
Tennis tournaments in Georgia (U.S. state)
Savannah Challenger
2010 in American tennis